The term cycle of violence refers to repeated and dangerous acts of violence  as a cyclical pattern,  associated with high emotions and doctrines of retribution or revenge.  The pattern, or cycle, repeats and can happen many times during a relationship. Each phase may last a different length of time, and over time the level of violence may increase. The phrase has been increasingly widespread since first popularized in the 1970s.

It often refers to violent behaviour learned as a child, and then repeated as an adult, therefore continuing on in a perceived cycle.

Within a relationship

A cycle of abuse generally follows the following pattern: 
 Abuse – The abuser initiates aggressive, verbal or physical abuse, designed to control and oppress the victim.
 Guilt – The abuser feels guilty for inflicting abusive behavior, primarily out of a concern of being found guilty of abuse rather than feelings of sympathy for the victim.
 Excuses – Rationalization of the behavior, including blame and excuses.
 "Normal" behavior – The abuser regains personal control, creates a peaceful phase in an attempt to make the victim feel comfortable in the relationship.
 Fantasy and planning – thinking of what the victim has done wrong, how they will be punished, and developing a plan to realize the fantasy.
 Set-up – the plan is "put in motion."

A cyclical nature of domestic violence is most prevalent in intimate terrorism (IT), which involve a pattern of ongoing control using emotional, physical and other forms of domestic violence and is what generally leads victims, who are most often women, to women's shelters.  It is what was traditionally the definition of domestic violence and is generally illustrated with the "Power and Control Wheel" to illustrate the different and inter-related forms of abuse.  Intimate terrorism is different from situational couple violence, which are isolated incidents of varying degrees of intensity.

A general, intricate and complicated cycle of traumatic violence and healing map was developed by Olga Botcharova when she worked at the Center for International Studies.

Intergenerational
Intergenerational cycles of violence occur when violence is passed from parent to child, or sibling to sibling.

Children exposed to domestic violence are likely to develop behavioral problems, such as regressing, exhibiting out of control behavior,  and imitating behaviors. Children may think that violence is an acceptable behavior of intimate relationships and become either the abused or the abuser. Recent research has questioned whether certain effects of domestic violence exposure on children are moderated and/or mediated by maternal psychological response such as maternal post-traumatic stress disorder, dissociation, and related biological markers.

An estimated 1/5 to 1/3 of teenagers subject to viewing domestic violence situations experience teen dating violence, regularly abusing or being abused by their partners verbally, mentally, emotionally, sexually and/or physically. Thirty to 50% of dating relationships can exhibit the same cycle of escalating violence in their marital relationships.

Physical punishment of children has also been linked to later domestic violence. Family violence researcher Murray A. Straus believes that disciplinary spanking forms "the most prevalent and important form of violence in American families", whose effects contribute to several major societal problems, including later assaults on spouses.

In politics

In 1377, Arab philosopher Ibn Khaldun identified a cycle of violence in which successive dynasties take control of a state and establish asabiyyah or social cohesion, enabling them to expand to the limit. Excess 'pomp' causes the dynasty then to stagnate, become sedentary and collapse, giving way to conquest by a new, more ruthless dynasty. This cycle plays out over the course of three generations.

According to John Mearsheimer, the cycle of violence between nations will continue indefinitely because the great powers fear each other, thus compete for power and dominance, in the belief that this will ensure safety.

'Cycle of violence' is also used more generally to describe any long-term factional dispute within a nation in which tit for tat acts of aggression occur frequently, as for example in Argentina in the 1970s, in Lebanon and Israel.

See also

References

Further reading

Books
 Engel, Beverly Breaking the Cycle of Abuse: How to Move Beyond Your Past to Create an Abuse-Free Future (2005)
 Biddix, Brenda FireEagle  Inside the Pain: (a survivors guide to breaking the cycles of abuse and domestic violence) (2006)
 Hameen, Latifah Suffering In Silence: Breaking the Cycle of Abuse (2006)
 Hegstrom, Paul Angry Men and the Women Who Love Them: Breaking the Cycle of Physical and Emotional Abuse (2004)
 Herbruck, Christine Comstock Breaking the cycle of child abuse (1979)
 Marecek, Mary Breaking Free from Partner Abuse: Voices of Battered Women Caught in the Cycle of Domestic Violence (1999)
 Mills, Linda G. Violent Partners: A Breakthrough Plan for Ending the Cycle of Abuse (2008)
 Ney, Philip G. & Peters, Anna Ending the Cycle of Abuse: The Stories of Women Abused As Children & the Group Therapy Techniques That Helped Them Heal (1995)
 Pugh, Roxanne Deliverance from the Vicious Cycle of Abuse  (2007)
 Quinn, Phil E. Spare the Rod: Breaking the Cycle of Child Abuse (Parenting/Social Concerns and Issues) (1988)
 Smullens, SaraKay Setting Yourself Free: Breaking the Cycle of Emtional Abuse in Family, Friendships, Work and Love (2002)
 Waldfogel, Jane The Future of Child Protection: How to Break the Cycle of Abuse and Neglect (2001)
 Wiehe, Vernon R. What Parents Need to Know About Sibling Abuse: Breaking the Cycle of Violence  (2002)

Academic journals
 Coxe, R & Holmes, W A study of the cycle of abuse among child molesters. Journal of Child Sexual Abuse, v10 n4 p111-18 2001
 Dodge, K. A., Bates, J. E. and Pettit, G. S. (1990) Mechanisms in the cycle of violence. Science, 250: 1678-1681.
 Egeland, B., Jacobvitz, D., & Sroufe, L. A. (1988). Breaking the cycle of abuse: Relationship predictors. Child Development, 59(4), 1080-1088.
 Egeland, B & Erickson, M - Rising above the past: Strategies for helping new mothers break the cycle of abuse and neglect. Zero to Three 1990, 11(2):29-35.
 Egeland, B. (1993) A history of abuse is a major risk factor for abusing the next generation. In: R. J. Gelles and D. R. Loseke (eds) Current controversies on family violence. Newbury Park, Calif.; London: Sage.
 Furniss, Kathleen K. Ending the cycle of abuse: what behavioral health professionals need to know about domestic violence.: An article from: Behavioral Healthcare (2007)
 Glasser, M  & Campbell, D & Glasser, A & Leitch I & Farrelly S Cycle of child sexual abuse: links between being a victim and becoming a perpetrator The British Journal of Psychiatry (2001) 179: 482-494
 Kirn, Timothy F. Sexual abuse cycle can be broken, experts assert.(Psychiatry): An article from: Internal Medicine News (2008)
 Quayle, E Taylor, M  - Child pornography and the Internet: Perpetuating a cycle of abuse Deviant Behavior, Volume 23, Issue 4 July 2002, pages 331 - 361
 Stone, AE &  Fialk, RJ Criminalizing the exposure of children to family violence: Breaking the cycle of abuse 20 Harv. Women's L.J. 205, Spring, 1997
 Woods, J Breaking the cycle of abuse and abusing: Individual psychotherapy for juvenile sex Clinical Child Psychology and Psychiatry, Vol. 2, No. 3, 379-392 (1997)

Abuse
Violence